Donald Ward Preston (born September 21, 1932) is an American jazz and rock keyboardist. He is known for working with Frank Zappa from the mid 1960s to the mid 1970s.

Biography
Preston was born into a family of musicians in Detroit and began studying music at an early age. His father played saxophone and trumpet, and had been offered the lead trumpet chair in the Tommy Dorsey Orchestra.  Upon moving the family to Detroit, Don's father became the staff arranger for NBC, and was the composer-in-residence for the Detroit Symphony Orchestra.  Don took sporadic lessons on the piano from the age of about five.

In 1950 Preston began a stint in the Army, serving in Trieste, Italy and playing in the Army band (initially piano, bass drum and glockenspiel) alongside Herbie Mann. In Trieste he shared a barracks with fellow recruit Buzz Gardner, who introduced him to contemporary classical composers such as Béla Bartók, Anton Webern, Alban Berg and Arnold Schoenberg.  Preston took up the bass while in the 98th Army band.

Upon his return to Detroit in 1953, Preston started playing bass with pianist Tommy Flanagan. He also sat in with Elvin Jones and others at the city's West End Cafe where Yusef Lateef conducted twice-a-week jam sessions with Milt Jackson's brother, bassist Alvin Jackson. Moving to Los Angeles in 1957, Preston played with the Hal McIntyre Orchestra and toured Canada backing Nat King Cole.  Between 1958 and 1965 Preston played with a number of jazz artists, including Shorty Rogers, Charlie Haden, Paul Bley, Emil Richards and Paul Beaver.

in 1966 Preston began a long collaboration with Frank Zappa as the keyboardist of the original Mothers of Invention. Preston performed and recorded with Zappa until 1974. During that time he was music director for Meredith Monk  (with whom he had previously shared a house) and started recording and performing electronic music.

He is a co-founder of the Grandmothers and is still active with the band, completing an extensive tour in 2000 and later tours through 2016.

Preston also appeared on-stage as a guest keyboardist with the Zappa tribute band Project/Object (featuring Zappa alumni Ike Willis and Napoleon Murphy Brock) for several shows in 2001, 2002 and 2016

From his Cryptogramophone Records biography:
"Often compared to Cecil Taylor for his style of attacking the keys with intense passion, Preston’s solos also reflect intellect, technical skills and a storyteller's way with a line. His playing, like his compositions, ranges across panoramas of mood and emotion, all colored with the freedom that comes from possessing remarkable facility.

Preston has played and recorded with the likes of John Lennon, Peter Erskine and Robby Krieger of The Doors. He has also scored more than 20 feature films and 14 plays. He's the winner of numerous awards, and has performed with the Los Angeles Philharmonic and London Philharmonic. Known to jazz and keyboard aficionados for his pioneering contributions in the use of synthesizers, legendary clarinetist and composer John Carter dubbed Don Preston the "father of modern synthesis."

Don has performed with many other artists, including: Lou Rawls, Al Jarreau, Billy Daniels, Johnnie Ray, Vaughn Monroe, Connie Francis, Art Davis, Carla Bley, Joe Beck, Leo Sayer, Charles Lloyd, Nelson Riddle, J.R. Monterose, Flo & Eddie (Howard Kaylan & Mark Volman of The Turtles), Don Ellis, Bobby Bradford, Michael Mantler and Yoko Ono.

Don Preston is no relation to the Don Preston who played lead guitar for Joe Cocker and Leon Russell in the 1970s. However, the former has admitted to accidentally receiving and unwittingly cashing a royalty check intended for the latter some years ago.

In 2002, Don Preston joined forces with Frank Zappa alumni Roy Estrada and Napoleon Murphy Brock, along with guitarist Ken Rosser, and drummer/percussionist Christopher Garcia to form the Grande Mothers Re:Invented.

Since then they have performed at numerous concerts and festivals throughout America, Canada and Europe, including Austria, Belgium, Croatia, Czech Republic, Denmark, England, Germany, Holland, Italy, Norway and Switzerland. (In 2005, guitarist, Miroslav Tadic replaced Ken Rosser in the lineup.)  Guitarist/bassist Robbie "Seahag" Mangano has filled in for Miroslav Tadic on Grande Mothers tours in 2009 and 2010, and Tom Fowler is scheduled to replace Roy Estrada on bass.
Recently Preston has lectured at Cornell, Harvard and Yale Universities, Sarah Lawrence College, U of A and Queen’s University Belfast.

In 2010 Preston, together with his lifelong friend Bunk Gardner, started a collaboration with guitar player/composer Jon Larsen and Zonic Entertainment. The first recordings were an audio-autobiographical production, The Don Preston Story, followed by the electronic music, contemporary space drama Colliding Galaxies. Preston released his own book entitled "Listen". At this time Preston and Bunk Gardner began touring as the Don & Bunk Show and have two tours under their belt in the eastern part of the US. They are now touring as a trio with Chris Garcia as The Grandmothers Of Invention. Preston is now writing the music for the film Dancing With Were-wolves, which will be released in July 2016.

Discography
 1992: Dom De Wilde Speaks
 1993: Vile Foamy Ectoplasm 
 1997: Hear Me Out
 2001: Io Landscapes 
 2001: Corpus Transfixum 
 2001: Music from Blood Diner & Other Films
 2002: Transcendence
 2004: Aysymetrical Construct with Bobby Bradford and Elliot Levine
 2007: Vile Foamy Ectoplasm (expanded from 1993)
 2009: 26 Pieces for Piano & Violin with Harry Scorzo
 2010: Colliding Galaxys (Zonic Entertainment)
 2011: Escape from 2012 with percussionist Andrea Centazzo
 2012: The Don Preston Story with Jon Larsen, interview
 2012: Filters, Oscillators & Envelopes 1967–1982

As Don Preston Trio (with Joel Hamilton and Alex Cline)
 2001: Transformation

As Don Preston's Akashic Ensemble
 2003: Inner Realities of Evolution
 2005: Tetragrammaton

As The Don & Bunk Show (with Bunk Gardner)
 2000: Necessity Is... 
 2002: Joined at the Hip
 2014: The Don and Bunk Show

With Frank Zappa/The Mothers of Invention/The Mothers
 1967: Absolutely Free
 1968: We're Only in It for the Money
 1968: Cruising with Ruben & the Jets
 1969: Mothermania
 1969: Uncle Meat
 1970: Burnt Weeny Sandwich
 1970: Weasels Ripped My Flesh
 1971: Fillmore East – June 1971
 1972: Just Another Band from L.A.
 1972: Waka/Jawaka
 1972: The Grand Wazoo
 1974: Roxy & Elsewhere
 1985: The Old Masters Box One Mystery Disc
 1986: The Old Masters Box Two Mystery Disc
 1988: You Can't Do That on Stage Anymore, Vol. 1
 1989: You Can't Do That on Stage Anymore, Vol. 3
 1991: You Can't Do That on Stage Anymore, Vol. 4
 1992: You Can't Do That on Stage Anymore, Vol. 5
 1992: You Can't Do That on Stage Anymore, Vol. 6
 1992: Playground Psychotics
 1993: Ahead of Their Time
 1996: The Lost Episodes
 2004: Quaudiophiliac
 1991: Beat the Boots: The Ark
 1991: Beat the Boots: Unmitigated Audacity
 1991: Beat the Boots: 'Tis the Season to Be Jelly
 1992: Beat the Boots II: Electric Aunt Jemima
 1992: Beat the Boots II: Swiss Cheese/Fire!
 1992: Beat the Boots II: Our Man in Nirvana
 2010: Greasy Love Songs

With The Grandmothers
 1981: The Grandmothers
 1982: Looking Up Granny's Dress
 1983: Fan Club Talk LP
 1994: Who Could Imagine
 2001: Eating the Astoria
 2001: 20 Year Anthology of the Grandmothers
 2001: The Eternal Question
 2003: A Grandmothers Night at The Gewandhaus 
 2014: Live in Bremen
 2018: Free Energy

As a guest
With Ant-Bee
 1993: The *#!%%? of Ant-Bee – Rarities Vol. 3 
 1993: Snorks and Wheezes
 1994: The Bizarre German E.P. 
 1994: With My Favorite "Vegetables" & Other Bizarre Muzik
 1997: Lunar Muzik 
 2011: Electronic Church Muzik

With John Carter
 1987: Dance of the Love Ghost
 1988: Shadows on a Wall 
 1989: Comin' On
 1990: Fields

With Eugene Chadbourne
 1993: 10 Most Wanted
 1994: Locked in a Dutch Coffeeshop with Jimmy Carl Black

With Robby Krieger
 1982: Versions
 1985: Robby Krieger

With Michael Mantler
 1985: Alien
 1987: Live 
 1996: The School of Understanding

With Sandro Oliva
 1995: Who the Fuck Is Sandro Oliva
 2004: Heavy Lightning

With Sixstep
 2013: "I'm Not an Atheist (Yet)" (single)
 2013: "Hear No Evil"

With others
 1969: Trout Mask Replica - Captain Beefheart & His Magic Band
 1969: Permanent Damage - The GTOs
 1971: The Visit - Bob Smith
 1971: Escalator over the Hill - Carla Bley/Paul Haines
 1972: Some Time in New York City - John Lennon
 1972: The Phlorescent Leech & Eddie - Flo & Eddie
 1972: Geronimo Black - Geronimo Black
 1974: Satin Doll - Bobbi Humphrey
 1979: Eskimo - The Residents
 1979: Apocalypse Now - Soundtrack
 1989: Ivo - John Patitucci/Peter Erskine/Airto/Ivo Perelman
 1989: Where Flamingos Fly - Gil Evans
 1989: Aurora - Peter Erskine/Buell Neidlinger
 1992: Jefferson Airplane Loves You - Jefferson Airplane
 1999: God Shave the Queen - Muffin Men
 2003: On Time - Arthur Barrow
 2011: Beyond the Holographic Veil - J21

Film scores
Android (1982)
The Being (1983)
Night Patrol (1984)
Eye of the Tiger (1986)
Blood Diner (1987)
The Underachievers (1987)
Pucker Up and Bark Like a Dog (1989)

References

1932 births
Living people
American organists
American male organists
American rock keyboardists
American jazz pianists
American rock pianists
American male pianists
Musicians from Flint, Michigan
The Mothers of Invention members
20th-century American pianists
Jazz musicians from Michigan
21st-century American keyboardists
21st-century organists
American male jazz musicians
20th-century American keyboardists